Reinier Rojas (born July 31, 1986) is a Cuban volleyball player. He competed for the Cuba men's national volleyball team at the 2016 Summer Olympics.

References

1986 births
Living people
Cuban men's volleyball players
Olympic volleyball players of Cuba
Volleyball players at the 2016 Summer Olympics
Place of birth missing (living people)